Johannes Theodorus 'Jan' Toorop (20 December 1858 – 3 March 1928) was a Dutch-Indonesian painter, who worked in various styles, including Symbolism, Art Nouveau, and Pointillism. His early work was influenced by the Amsterdam Impressionism movement.

Biography

Johannes Theodorus Toorop was born on 20 December 1858 in Purworejo on the island of Java in the Dutch East Indies (present-day Indonesia). His father was Christoffel Theodorus Toorop, a civil servant, and his mother was Maria Magdalena Cooke. He was the third of five children and lived on the island of Bangka near Sumatra until he was nine years old. He was then sent to school in Batavia on Java.

In 1869 he left Indonesia for the Netherlands, where he studied in Delft and Amsterdam. In 1880 he became a student at the Rijksakademie in Amsterdam. He met the Belgian painter William Degouve de Nuncques in 1883 and the two shared a studio for a time and developed a strong friendship. From 1882 to 1886 he lived in Brussels where he joined Les XX (Les Vingts), a group of artists centred on James Ensor. Toorop worked in various styles during these years, such as Realism, Impressionism Neo-Impressionism and Post-Impressionism.

After his marriage to Annie Hall, a British woman, in 1886, Toorop alternated his time between The Hague, England and Brussels, and after 1890 also the Dutch seaside town of Katwijk aan Zee.  During this period he developed his unique Symbolist style, with dynamic, unpredictable lines based on Javanese motifs, highly stylised willowy figures, and curvilinear designs.

In the late 19th century (in 1897) Toorop lived for 20 years in a small house on the market in the seaside town Domburg, Walcheren, Zeeland. He worked with a group of fellow artists, including Marinus Zwart and Piet Mondrian. There was no joint endeavor or common style among them. Each followed his individual personality, but they sought their inspiration in "the Zeeland Light", in the dunes, forests, beaches and the characteristic Zeeland population. Toorop was the center of this group.

His 1900 novel portrait of his friend Marie Jeanette de Lange was made whilst she was not wearing fashionable (restrictive) clothing and it was in the style of Pointillism.

Thereafter he turned to Art Nouveau styles, in which a similar play of lines is used for decorative purposes, without any apparent symbolic meaning. In 1905, he converted to Catholicism and began producing religious works. He also created book illustrations, posters, and stained glass designs.

Throughout his life Toorop also produced portraits, in sketch format and as paintings, which range in style from highly realistic to impressionistic.

Toorop died on 3 March 1928 in The Hague in the Netherlands. His daughter Charley Toorop (1891–1955) was also a painter, as was his grandson Edgar Fernhout.

Public collections
Among the public collections holding works by Jan Toorop are:
 Museum de Fundatie, Zwolle, Netherlands
 Kröller-Müller Museum

Works

References

Sources 

 Victorine Hefting: Jan Toorop. 18 February-9 April 1989, Haags Gemeentemuseum, The Hague. Forew. by Robert de Haas; transl. by Patricia Wardle. The Hague, Haags Gemeentemuseum, 1989.

External links

Jan Toorop Research Center

Art Nouveau painters
Dutch Impressionist painters
Dutch people of Indonesian descent
Dutch people of British descent
Post-impressionist painters
Symbolist painters
1858 births
1928 deaths
Indo people
Delft University of Technology alumni
People from Purworejo Regency
Dutch Roman Catholics
Dutch stamp designers